Helisoma is a genus of freshwater air-breathing snail, a pulmonate gastropod mollusk in the family Planorbidae, the ram's horn snails.

Synonym:
  Carinifex Binney, 1864
Helisoma snails are an intermediate host of Megalodiscus temperatus.

Species
Species within the genus Helisoma include:
 Helisoma anceps, sometimes known as Planorbella anceps
 Helisoma campanulatum (Say, 1821) : synonym of Planorbella campanulata (Say, 1821)

References

Planorbidae